DAFCA, Inc. was an EDA software company focused on post-silicon validation, debug, and in-system bring-up of integrated circuits. DAFCA's tools allow design teams to incorporate patented and compact reconfigurable instrumentation IP into their devices, pre-silicon, in order to observe, discover, and diagnose at-speed, in-silicon functional behavior.

The acronym DAFCA originally stood for Design Automation for Flexible Chip Architecture, but the long form is vestigial. The company was founded by Peter Levin and Miron Abramovici.

Sawblade Ventures, LLC (SbV) of Austin, Texas has acquired all technology rights, patents, intellectual property and software previously owned by DAFCA and subsequent entity incarnations.

SbV is dedicated to exploiting the unique and revolutionary qualities embodied in the pioneering work done by Dr. Miron Abramovici and members of the DAFCA engineering team.

References
EEtimes article on post-silicon debugging

Electronic design automation companies